A former island is a mass of land that was once an island, but has been joined to a mainland, another island, or engulfed by a body of water. The process of joining might be the result of volcanic activity, moving tidal sands, or through land reclamation. Islands engulfed by the sea may have lowered because of subsidence, tectonic activity, erosion, or rising sea levels. For example, the New Moor island in Bangladesh existed in the 1970s, but was engulfed by the Bay of Bengal in 2011.

Examples
 Eldøyane, a partially artificial former island in Norway
 Any of several former Islands in the River Thames, England
 Sevan Island, a former island in Armenia, now a peninsula
 Urk, a former island now part of the reclaimed Noordoostpolder in the Netherlands, a victim of the Zuiderzee Works, a land fill designed by Cornelis Lely
 Sakurajima, a former island now joined to the mainland in Japan
 Mount Muria, now part of Java

See also

 Ghost Island (disambiguation)
 List of lost lands
 Phantom island

Further reading
 Johnson, H & Kuwahara, S (2016), " Sakurajima: Maintaining an island essence", Shima: The International Journal of Research into Island Cultures, vol. 10, no.1, pp. 48–66.

References